Hayat Bakshi Mosque also Hayat Bakshi Begum Masjid or Grand Mosque''' is a mosque located in Hayathnagar, near Hyderabad, India. It was constructed in 1672 during the reign of Abdullah Qutb Shah the fifth Sultan of Golconda, and named after Hayat Bakshi Begum.

There is a mosque with the same name in "Qutb Shahi tombs" as well.

Structure and architecture
The Mosque is built in typical Qutub Shahi architecture; with the Sarai, a rest house for the weary travelers. The façade features five arches, two minarets as well as a frieze and parapet which runs around the twelve-sided arcaded galleries protruding from the corner minarets. The prayer hall is set on a raised platform. Toward the eastern side of the platform and below the mosque is an ablution tank. The large complex occupies nearly 5 acres. The caravan sarai (rest house) is a 150 m by 130 m courtyard. This guest house is said to have 130 rooms. Hathi Bawli (meaning well of elephant), is a very large well on the north-east of the mosque.

Controversy
In May 2009, the archaeology and museums department requested permission from the Greater Hyderabad Municipal Corporation (GHMC) to tear down 20 structures abutting the Hayat Bakshi Begum Mosque in violation of the Ancient Monuments and Archaeological Sites and Remains Act of 1960.

See also
 Islam in India
 Heritage Structures of Hyderabad

References

Mosques in Hyderabad, India
Tourist attractions in Hyderabad, India
Heritage structures in Hyderabad, India
Qutb Shahi architecture
Buildings and structures in Hyderabad, India